The Dutch National Time Trial Championship is a time trial race that takes place inside the Dutch National Cycling Championship, and decides the best cyclist in this type of race. The first edition took place in 1991. The first race winner of the time trial championship was Bart Voskamp in 1991. Stef Clement and Tom Dumoulin hold the record for the most wins in the men's championship with four. The women's record is held by Leontien van Moorsel with six wins.

Multiple winners

Men

Women

Men

Elite

U23

Women

Elite

See also

Dutch National Road Race Championships
Dutch Headwind Cycling Championships
National Road Cycling Championships

External links

Past winners on cyclingarchives.com

 
National road cycling championships
Cycle races in the Netherlands
Recurring sporting events established in 1991
1991 establishments in the Netherlands
Dutch cycling time trial champions